Vaskna is a lake of Estonia.

See also

List of lakes of Estonia

Lakes of Estonia
Rõuge Parish
Lakes of Võru County